Six: The Mark Unleashed is a 2004 Christian action-drama film directed by Kevin Downes and starring Stephen Baldwin, Kevin Downes, David A. R. White, Eric Roberts, and Jeffrey Dean Morgan. It was released June 29, 2004, and debuted at #6 on the Christian Booksellers Association Best Sellers List.

Plot
The film is set in the end-times, or The Great Tribulation, after the rapture, when the earth has been taken over, and the mark of the Beast - an implant in the right hand or forehead - is being imposed on everyone worldwide. Those who take the mark become part of 'The Community', those who refuse are imprisoned and after three weeks are beheaded.

Two non-Christian renegades (Kevin Downes and David A. R. White) steal a car for a friend who has also refused the mark. When they arrive at his place they find that he changed his mind and took the mark and "feels so much happier". The two are then captured by police and taken to prison.

Smuggler Tom Newman (Jeffrey Dean Morgan) is also captured by a police unit led by Jeseca Newman (Amy Moon), his ex-wife who took the mark. He is tortured until he agrees to infiltrate a Christian group in the prison in order to kill Elijah Cohen, a Christian leader who remains at large.  Jeseca warns him if he tries to escape, he will be captured and turned over to Preston Scott (Brad Heller), to be tortured.

All three of them meet in prison and decide to try and escape, to a place called Prodigal City, a safe haven. Brody and Tom do not like this city and try to leave. Preston Scott meets up with them, and the two men are tortured. Tom refuses the mark and is beheaded, but Brody accepts, and claims, "It was the wrong choice."

Cast

 Stephen Baldwin as Luke
 David A. R. White as Brody Sutton
 Kevin Downes as Jerry Willis
 Jeffrey Dean Morgan as Tom Newman
 Eric Roberts as Dallas
 Brad Heller as Preston Scott
 Amy Moon as Jeseca Newman
 Andrea Logan White as Prison Guard
 Troy Winbush as Luis

Critical reception

Reviews were mixed, with film critic David Nusair calling it an "utterly worthless piece of work" and giving it zero out of four stars. Evangelical reviewers were much kinder. Christian Ted Baehr of Movieguide described it as an "entertaining movie and a useful tool for leading people to consider the claims of the Gospel." Christian author John Hagee said of the film, “The power of the gospel to transform the lives of the characters is shown with deeply moving reality. So real is the presentation of the plan of salvation in this movie, the viewer will be left without excuse.” Evangelist Jack Van Impe was quoted as saying, “Both Rexella [his wife] and I believe this to be the greatest religious release we have ever watched. I know you will be tremendously moved as never before when viewing this Holy Spirit led production.”

References

External links 

  The Movie Six Official Site

 
 

2004 films
Films about evangelicalism
American thriller drama films
2004 action thriller films
2000s thriller drama films
2004 science fiction films
2004 drama films
Films with screenplays by David A. R. White
Christian apocalyptic films
Films with screenplays by Kevin Downes
Films produced by Kevin Downes
Films directed by Kevin Downes
Films produced by Bobby Downes
2000s English-language films
2000s American films